Leketor Member-Meneh (born June 1, 1999) is an American professional volleyball player who plays as a outside hitter for Italian Series A2 team Futura Volley Giovania. She played collegiately at the University of Missouri and University of Pittsburgh, where she was an All-American in 2021.

Personal life

Member-Meneh was born and raised in St.  Louis, Missouri. She has seven brothers and sisters. She attended high school at Lutheran High School South in St. Louis, and was also a track & field player. She helped her high school team to its first ever volleyball state title in 2016. She was considered a top 50 recruit in her graduating class.  She chose to attend Missouri over offers from Duke, Kansas State, North Carolina State and St. Louis.

Career

College

Member-Meneh played four seasons at Missouri, and transferred to Pittsburgh in 2021, using the extra year of eligibility granted by the NCAA due to the COVID-19 pandemic.

At Pittsburgh in 2021, she helped Pittsburgh reach the NCAA Final Four for the first time in school history.  She was named an AVCA All-America Second Team selection and was Pittburgh's sole selection to the 2021 NCAA Final Four All-Tournament Team. During the tournament, she tied the Pitt record for most kills in a single NCAA Tournament match during the 25-point rally scoring era (2008-present) with 21 against Purdue in the regional final. During the season, she led Pitt with 3.22 kills and 3.74 points per set and was second on the team with 2.32 digs per set.

Professional clubs

  Futura Volley Giovani (it) (2022–)

Futura Volley Giovani announced her signing on May 31, 2022.

Awards and honors

College

AVCA All-America Second Team (2021)
NCAA Final Four All-Tournament Team (2021)
NCAA Regional All-Tournament MVP (Pittsburgh) (2021)
All-ACC First Team (2021)
All-SEC (2018)
SEC All-Freshman Team (2017)

References

1999 births
Living people
Sportspeople from St. Louis
Outside hitters
American women's volleyball players
Missouri Tigers women's volleyball players
Pittsburgh Panthers women's volleyball players
American expatriate sportspeople in Italy
Expatriate volleyball players in Italy
African-American volleyball players
20th-century African-American people
21st-century African-American sportspeople
21st-century African-American women